Francesca Jones was the defending champion but chose not to participate.

Mina Hodzic won the title, defeating Lucie Nguyen Tan in the final, 6–3, 6–3.

Seeds

Draw

Finals

Top half

Bottom half

References

External links
Main Draw

Engie Open de Biarritz - Singles